Loxocrambus hospition is a moth in the family Crambidae. It was described by Stanisław Błeszyński in 1963. It is found in North America, where it has been recorded from western Texas, through New Mexico to southern Arizona.

Adults are on wing from July to August.

References

Crambini
Moths described in 1963
Moths of North America